Lewis G. Galloway was an American politician. He was the 7th Secretary of State of Mississippi, serving from 1841 to 1843.

Biography 
Lewis G. Galloway was from Holmes County, Mississippi. He was a member of the Whig Party. He became the Secretary of State of Mississippi in November 1841. His tenure as Secretary of State of Mississippi ended in November 1843. He was succeeded by Wilson Hemingway.

References 

Secretaries of State of Mississippi
Mississippi Whigs
19th-century American politicians
People from Holmes County, Mississippi
Year of birth missing
Year of death missing